The women's 100 metre freestyle event at the 2000 Summer Olympics took place on 20–21 September at the Sydney International Aquatic Centre in Sydney, Australia.

Dutch rising star Inge de Bruijn stormed home on the final lap to claim her second gold at these Games. She powered past her rivals in a star-studded field to touch the wall first in 53.83. Earlier in the semifinals, she delivered a time of 53.77 to erase her own world record by 0.03 of a second. Almost stealing the race from lane one, Therese Alshammar took home the silver in a Swedish record of 54.33. Meanwhile, top favorites Dara Torres and Jenny Thompson gave the Americans a further reason to celebrate, as they shared bronze medals in a matching time of 54.63. This was also Thompson's ninth career medal at these Games, making her the most decorated female swimmer in Olympic history.

Slovakia's Martina Moravcová, who captured two silver medals in swimming, finished outside the podium in fifth place at 54.72. South Africa's Helene Muller managed to pull off a sixth-place finish in an African standard of 55.19. Japan's Sumika Minamoto (55.53) and De Bruijn's teammate Wilma van Rijn (55.58) closed out the field.

Notable swimmers failed to reach the top 8 final, featuring Australia's overwhelming favorites Sarah Ryan and Susie O'Neill, Germany's Sandra Völker, silver medalist in Atlanta four years earlier, and Egypt's Rania Elwani, who surprisingly reached the semifinals from an unseeded heat.

Records
Prior to this competition, the existing world and Olympic records were as follows.

The following new world and Olympic records were set during this competition.

Results

Heats

Semifinals

Semifinal 1

Semifinal 2

Final

References

External links
 

F
2000 in women's swimming
Women's events at the 2000 Summer Olympics